The Acts of Union were two Acts of Parliament: the Union with Scotland Act 1706 passed by the Parliament of England, and the Union with England Act 1707 passed by the Parliament of Scotland. They put into effect the terms of the Treaty of Union that had been agreed on 22 July 1706, following negotiation between commissioners representing the parliaments of the two countries. By the two Acts, the Kingdom of England and the Kingdom of Scotlandwhich at the time were separate states with separate legislatures, but with the same monarchwere, in the words of the Treaty, "United into One Kingdom by the Name of Great Britain".

The two countries had shared a monarch since the Union of the Crowns in 1603, when King James VI of Scotland inherited the English throne from his double first cousin twice removed, Queen Elizabeth I. Although described as a Union of Crowns, and in spite of James's acknowledgement of his accession to a single Crown, England and Scotland were officially separate Kingdoms until 1707 (as opposed to the implied creation of a single unified Kingdom, exemplified by the later Kingdom of Great Britain). Prior to the Acts of Union there had been three previous attempts (in 1606, 1667, and 1689) to unite the two countries by Acts of Parliament, but it was not until the early 18th century that both political establishments came to support the idea, albeit for different reasons.

The Acts took effect on 1 May 1707. On this date, the Scottish Parliament and the English Parliament united to form the Parliament of Great Britain, based in the Palace of Westminster in London, the previous home of the English Parliament. This specific process is sometimes referred to as the "union of the Parliaments" in Scotland.

Political background prior to 1707

1603–1660
Prior to 1603, England and Scotland had different monarchs; as Elizabeth I never married, after 1567, her heir-presumptive became the Stuart king of Scotland, James VI, who was brought up as a Protestant. After her death, the two Crowns were held in personal union by James, as James I of England, and James VI of Scotland. He announced his intention to unite the two, using the royal prerogative to take the title "King of Great Britain",  and give a British character to his court and person.

The 1603 Union of England and Scotland Act established a joint Commission to agree terms, but the English Parliament was concerned this would lead to the imposition of an absolutist structure similar to that of Scotland. James was forced to withdraw his proposals, and attempts to revive it in 1610 were met with hostility.

Instead, he set about creating a unified Church of Scotland and England, as the first step towards a centralised, Unionist state. However, despite both being nominally Episcopal in structure, the two were very different in doctrine; the Church of Scotland, or kirk, was Calvinist in doctrine, and viewed many Church of England practices as little better than Catholicism. As a result, attempts to impose religious policy by James and his son Charles I ultimately led to the 1639–1651 Wars of the Three Kingdoms.

The 1639–1640 Bishops' Wars confirmed the primacy of the kirk, and established a Covenanter government in Scotland. The Scots remained neutral when the First English Civil War began in 1642, before becoming concerned at the impact on Scotland of a Royalist victory. Presbyterian leaders like Argyll viewed union as a way to ensure free trade between England and Scotland, and preserve a Presbyterian kirk.

Under the 1643 Solemn League and Covenant, the Covenanters agreed to provide military support for the English Parliament, in return for religious union. Although the treaty referred repeatedly to 'union' between England, Scotland, and Ireland, political union had little support outside the Kirk Party. Even religious union was opposed by the Episcopalian majority in the Church of England, and Independents like Oliver Cromwell, who dominated the New Model Army.

The Scots and English Presbyterians were political conservatives, who increasingly viewed the Independents, and associated radical groups like the Levellers, as a bigger threat than the Royalists. Both Royalists and Presbyterians agreed monarchy was divinely ordered, but disagreed on the nature and extent of Royal authority over the church. When Charles I surrendered in 1646, they allied with their former enemies to restore him to the English throne.

After defeat in the 1647–1648 Second English Civil War, Scotland was occupied by English troops which were withdrawn once the so-called Engagers whom Cromwell held responsible for the war had been replaced by the Kirk Party. In December 1648, Pride's Purge confirmed Cromwell's political control in England by removing Presbyterian MPs from Parliament, and executing Charles in January 1649. Seeing this as sacrilege, the Kirk Party proclaimed Charles II King of Scotland and Great Britain, and agreed to restore him to the English throne.

Defeat in the 1649–1651 Third English Civil War or Anglo-Scottish War resulted in Scotland's incorporation into the Commonwealth of England, Scotland and Ireland, largely driven by Cromwell's determination to break the power of the kirk, which he held responsible for the Anglo-Scottish War. The 1652 Tender of Union was followed on 12 April 1654 by An Ordinance by the Protector for the Union of England and Scotland, creating the Commonwealth of England, Scotland and Ireland. It was ratified by the Second Protectorate Parliament on 26 June 1657, creating a single Parliament in Westminster, with 30 representatives each from Scotland and Ireland added to the existing English members.

1660–1707

While integration into the Commonwealth established free trade between Scotland and England, the economic benefits were diminished by the costs of military occupation. Both Scotland and England associated union with heavy taxes and military rule; it had little popular support in either country, and was dissolved after the Restoration of Charles II in 1660.

The Scottish economy was badly damaged by the English Navigation Acts of 1660 and 1663 and England's wars with the Dutch Republic, Scotland's major export market. An Anglo-Scots Trade Commission was set up in January 1668 but the English had no interest in making concessions, as the Scots had little to offer in return. In 1669, Charles II revived talks on political union; his motives were to weaken Scotland's commercial and political links with the Dutch, still seen as an enemy and complete the work of his grandfather James I. Continued opposition meant these negotiations were abandoned by the end of 1669.

Following the Glorious Revolution of 1688, a Scottish Convention met in Edinburgh in April 1689 to agree a new constitutional settlement; during which the Scottish Bishops backed a proposed union in an attempt to preserve Episcopalian control of the kirk. William and Mary were supportive of the idea but it was opposed both by the Presbyterian majority in Scotland and the English Parliament. Episcopacy in Scotland was abolished in 1690, alienating a significant part of the political class; it was this element that later formed the bedrock of opposition to Union.

The 1690s were a time of economic hardship in Europe as a whole and Scotland in particular, a period now known as the Seven ill years which led to strained relations with England. In 1698, the Company of Scotland Trading to Africa and the Indies received a charter to raise capital through public subscription. The Company invested in the Darién scheme, an ambitious plan funded almost entirely by Scottish investors to build a colony on the Isthmus of Panama for trade with East Asia. The scheme was a disaster; the losses of over £150,000 severely impacted the Scottish commercial system.

Political motivations

The Acts of Union may be seen within a wider European context of increasing state centralisation during the late 17th and early 18th centuries, including the monarchies of France, Sweden, Denmark and Spain. While there were exceptions, such as the Dutch Republic or the Republic of Venice, the trend was clear.

The dangers of the monarch using one Parliament against the other first became apparent in 1647 and 1651. It resurfaced during the 1679 to 1681 Exclusion Crisis, caused by English resistance to the Catholic James II (of England, VII of Scotland) succeeding his brother Charles. James was sent to Edinburgh in 1681 as Lord High Commissioner; in August, the Scottish Parliament passed the Succession Act, confirming the divine right of kings, the rights of the natural heir "regardless of religion", the duty of all to swear allegiance to that king, and the independence of the Scottish Crown. It then went beyond ensuring James's succession to the Scottish throne by explicitly stating the aim was to make his exclusion from the English throne impossible without "the fatall and dreadfull consequences of a civil war".

The issue reappeared during the 1688 Glorious Revolution. The English Parliament generally supported replacing James with his Protestant daughter Mary, but resisted making her Dutch husband William of Orange joint ruler. They gave way only when he threatened to return to the Netherlands, and Mary refused to rule without him. 
In Scotland, conflict over control of the kirk between Presbyterians and Episcopalians and William's position as a fellow Calvinist put him in a much stronger position. He originally insisted on retaining Episcopacy, and the Committee of the Articles, an unelected body that controlled what legislation Parliament could debate. Both would have given the Crown far greater control than in England but he withdrew his demands due to the 1689–1692 Jacobite Rising.

English perspective 

The English succession was provided for by the English Act of Settlement 1701, which ensured that the monarch of England would be a Protestant member of the House of Hanover. Until the Union of Parliaments, the Scottish throne might be inherited by a different successor after Queen Anne, who had said in her first speech to the English parliament that a Union was "very necessary". The Scottish Act of Security 1704, however, was passed after the English parliament, without consultation with Scotland, had designated Electoress Sophia of Hanover (granddaughter of James I and VI) as Anne's successor, if Anne died childless. The Act of Security granted the Parliament of Scotland, the three Estates, the right to choose a successor and explicitly required a choice different from the English monarch unless the English were to grant free trade and navigation. Next the Alien Act 1705 was passed in the English parliament designating Scots in England as "foreign nationals" and blocking about half of all Scottish trade by boycotting exports to England or its colonies, unless Scotland came back to negotiate a Union. To encourage a Union, "honours, appointments, pensions and even arrears of pay and other expenses were distributed to clinch support from Scottish peers and MPs".

Scottish perspective 
The Scottish economy was severely impacted by privateers during the 1688–1697 Nine Years' War and the 1701 War of the Spanish Succession, with the Royal Navy focusing on protecting English ships. This compounded the economic pressure caused by the Darien scheme, and the seven ill years of the 1690s, when 5–15% of the population died of starvation. The Scottish Parliament was promised financial assistance, protection for its maritime trade, and an end to economic restrictions on trade with England.

The votes of the Court party, influenced by Queen Anne's favourite, the Duke of Queensberry, combined with the majority of the Squadrone Volante, were sufficient to ensure passage of the treaty. Article 15 granted £398,085 and ten shillings sterling to Scotland, a sum known as The Equivalent, to offset future liability towards the English national debt, which at the time was £18 million, but as Scotland had no national debt, most of the sum was used to compensate the investors in the Darien scheme, with 58.6% of the fund allocated to its shareholders and creditors.

The role played by bribery has long been debated; £20,000 was distributed by the Earl of Glasgow, of which 60% went to James Douglas, 2nd Duke of Queensberry, the Queen's Commissioner in Parliament. Another negotiator, Argyll was given an English peerage. Robert Burns is commonly quoted in support of the argument of corruption: "We're bought and sold for English Gold, Such a Parcel of Rogues in a Nation." As historian Christopher Whatley points out, this was actually a 17th-century Scots folk song; but he agrees money was paid, though suggests the economic benefits were supported by most Scots MPs, with the promises made for benefits to peers and MPs, even if it was reluctantly. Professor Sir Tom Devine agreed that promises of "favours, sinecures, pensions, offices and straightforward cash bribes became indispensable to secure government majorities". As for representation going forwards, Scotland was, in the new united parliament, only to get 45 MPs, one more than Cornwall, and only 16 (unelected) peers in the House of Lords.

Sir George Lockhart of Carnwath, the only Scottish negotiator to oppose Union, noted "the whole nation appears against (it)". Another negotiator, Sir John Clerk of Penicuik, who was an ardent Unionist, observed it was "contrary to the inclinations of at least three-fourths of the Kingdom". As the seat of the Scottish Parliament, demonstrators in Edinburgh feared the impact of its loss on the local economy. Elsewhere, there was widespread concern about the independence of the kirk, and possible tax rises.

As the Treaty passed through the Scottish Parliament, opposition was voiced by petitions from shires, burghs, presbyteries and parishes. The Convention of Royal Burghs claimed

Not one petition in favour of Union was received by Parliament. On the day the treaty was signed, the carillonneur in St Giles Cathedral, Edinburgh, rang the bells in the tune "Why should I be so sad on my wedding day?" Threats of widespread civil unrest resulted in Parliament imposing martial law.

The Union was carried by members of the Scottish elite against the wishes of the great majority. The Scottish population was overwhelmingly against the union with England, and virtually all of the print discourses of 1699-1706  spoke against incorporating union, creating the conditions for wide spread rejection of the treaty in 1706 and 1707. Country party tracts condemned English influence within the existing framework of the Union of the Crowns and asserted the need to renegotiate this union. During this period, the Darien failure, the succession issue and the Worcester seizure all provided opportunities for Scottish writers to attack the Court Party as unpatriotic and reaffirm the need to fight for true interests of Scotland. According to Scottish historian William Ferguson, the Acts of Union were a 'political job' by England that was achieved by economic incentives, patronage and bribery to secure the passage of the Union treaty in the Scottish Parliament in order satisfy English political imperatives, with the union being unacceptable to the Scottish people including both the Jacobites and Covenanters. The differences between Scottish were "subsumed by the same sort of patriotism or nationalism that first appeared in the Declaration of Arbroath of 1320." Ferguson provides the well-timed payments of salary arrears to members of Parliament as proof of bribery and argues that the Scottish people had been betrayed by their Parliament.

Ireland
Ireland, though a kingdom under the same crown, was not included in the union. It remained a separate kingdom, unrepresented in Parliament, and was legally subordinate to Great Britain until the Renunciation Act of 1783.

In July 1707 each House of the Parliament of Ireland passed a congratulatory address to Queen Anne, praying that "May God put it in your royal heart to add greater strength and lustre to your crown, by a still more comprehensive Union". The British government did not respond to the invitation and an equal union between Great Britain and Ireland was out of consideration until the 1790s.  The union with Ireland finally came about on 1 January 1801.

Treaty and passage of the 1707 Acts

Deeper political integration had been a key policy of Queen Anne from the time she acceded to the throne in 1702. Under the aegis of the Queen and her ministers in both kingdoms, the parliaments of England and Scotland agreed to participate in fresh negotiations for a union treaty in 1705.

Both countries appointed 31 commissioners to conduct the negotiations. Most of the Scottish commissioners favoured union, and about half were government ministers and other officials. At the head of the list was Queensberry, and the Lord Chancellor of Scotland, the Earl of Seafield. The English commissioners included the Lord High Treasurer, the Earl of Godolphin, the Lord Keeper, Baron Cowper, and a large number of Whigs who supported union. Tories were not in favour of union and only one was represented among the commissioners.

Negotiations between the English and Scottish commissioners took place between 16 April and 22 July 1706 at the Cockpit in London. Each side had its own particular concerns. Within a few days, and with only one face to face meeting of all 62 commissioners, England had gained a guarantee that the Hanoverian dynasty would succeed Queen Anne to the Scottish crown, and Scotland received a guarantee of access to colonial markets, in the hope that they would be placed on an equal footing in terms of trade.

After negotiations ended in July 1706, the acts had to be ratified by both Parliaments. In Scotland, about 100 of the 227 members of the Parliament of Scotland were supportive of the Court Party. For extra votes the pro-court side could rely on about 25 members of the Squadrone Volante, led by the Marquess of Montrose and the Duke of Roxburghe. Opponents of the court were generally known as the Country party, and included various factions and individuals such as the Duke of Hamilton, Lord Belhaven and Andrew Fletcher of Saltoun, who spoke forcefully and passionately against the union, when the Scottish Parliament began its debate on the act on 3 October 1706, but the deal had already been done. The Court party enjoyed significant funding from England and the Treasury and included many who had accumulated debts following the Darien Disaster.

The Act ratifying the Treaty of Union was finally carried in the Parliament of Scotland by 110 votes to 69 on 16 January 1707, with a number of key amendments. News of the ratification and of the amendments was received in Westminster, where the Act was passed quickly through both Houses and received the royal assent on 6 March.<ref>Macrae, The Rev. Alexander: Scotland Since the Union' (1902)</ref> Though the English Act was later in date, it bore the year '1706' while Scotland's was '1707', as the legal year in England began only on 25 March.

In Scotland, the Duke of Queensberry was largely responsible for the successful passage of the Union act by the Parliament of Scotland. In Scotland, he also received much criticism from local residents, but in England he was cheered for his action. He had personally received around half of the funding awarded by the Westminster Treasury for himself. In April 1707, he travelled to London to attend celebrations at the royal court, and was greeted by groups of noblemen and gentry lined along the road. From Barnet, the route was lined with crowds of cheering people, and once he reached London a huge crowd had formed. On 17 April, the Duke was gratefully received by the Queen at Kensington Palace.

Provisions

The Treaty of Union, agreed between representatives of the Parliament of England and the Parliament of Scotland in 1706, consisted of 25 articles, 15 of which were economic in nature. In Scotland, each article was voted on separately and several clauses in articles were delegated to specialised subcommittees. Article 1 of the treaty was based on the political principle of an incorporating union and this was secured by a majority of 116 votes to 83 on 4 November 1706. To minimise the opposition of the Church of Scotland, an Act was also passed to secure the Presbyterian establishment of the Church, after which the Church stopped its open opposition, although hostility remained at lower levels of the clergy. The treaty as a whole was finally ratified on 16 January 1707 by a majority of 110 votes to 69.

The two Acts incorporated provisions for Scotland to send representative peers from the Peerage of Scotland to sit in the House of Lords. It guaranteed that the Church of Scotland would remain the established church in Scotland, that the Court of Session would "remain in all time coming within Scotland", and that Scots law would "remain in the same force as before". Other provisions included the restatement of the Act of Settlement 1701 and the ban on Roman Catholics from taking the throne. It also created a customs union and monetary union.

The Act provided that any "laws and statutes" that were "contrary to or inconsistent with the terms" of the Act would "cease and become void".

Related Acts

The Scottish Parliament also passed the Protestant Religion and Presbyterian Church Act 1707 guaranteeing the status of the Presbyterian Church of Scotland. The English Parliament passed a similar Act, 6 Anne c.8.

Soon after the Union, the Act 6 Anne c.40later named the Union with Scotland (Amendment) Act 1707united the English and Scottish Privy Councils and decentralised Scottish administration by appointing justices of the peace in each shire to carry out administration. In effect it took the day-to-day government of Scotland out of the hands of politicians and into those of the College of Justice.

On 18 December 1707 the Act for better Securing the Duties of East India Goods was passed which extended the monopoly of the East India Company to Scotland.

In the year following the Union, the Treason Act 1708 abolished the Scottish law of treason and extended the corresponding English law across Great Britain.

 Evaluations 
Scotland benefited, says historian G.N. Clark, gaining "freedom of trade with England and the colonies" as well as "a great expansion of markets". The agreement guaranteed the permanent status of the Presbyterian church in Scotland, and the separate system of laws and courts in Scotland.  Clark argued that in exchange for the financial benefits and bribes that England bestowed, what it gained was

of inestimable value. Scotland accepted the Hanoverian succession and gave up her power of threatening England's military security and complicating her commercial relations ... The sweeping successes of the eighteenth-century wars owed much to the new unity of the two nations.

By the time Samuel Johnson and James Boswell made their tour in 1773, recorded in A Journey to the Western Islands of Scotland, Johnson noted that Scotland was "a nation of which the commerce is hourly extending, and the wealth increasing" and in particular that Glasgow had become one of the greatest cities of Britain.

 Economic perspective 

Scottish historian Christopher Smout notes that prior to the Union of the Crowns, the Scottish economy had been flourishing completely independently of the English one, with little to no interaction between each other. Developing a closer economic partnership with England was unsustainable, and Scotland's main trade partner was continental Europe, especially the Netherlands, where Scotland could trade its wool and fish for luxurious imports such as iron, spices or wine. Scotland and England were generally hostile to each other and were often at war, and the alliance with France gave Scotland privileges that further encouraged developing cultural and economic ties with the continent rather than England. The union of 1603 only served the political and dynastic ambitions of King James and was detrimental to Scotland economically – exports that Scotland offered were largely irrelevant to English economy, and while the Privy Council of Scotland did keep its ability to manage internal economic policy, the foreign policy of Scotland was not in hands of England. This limited Scotland's hitherto expansive trade with continental Europe, and forced it into English wars.

While the Scottish economy already suffered because of English wars with France and Spain in 1620s, the civil wars in England had a particularly disastrous effect on Scotland and left it relatively impoverished as a result. The economy would slowly recover after that, but it came at the cost of being increasingly dependent on trade with England. A power struggle developed between Scotland and England in 1680s, as Scotland recovered from the political turmoil and set on its own economic ambitions, which London considered a threat to its dominant and well-established position. English wars with continental powers undermined Scottish trade with France and the Netherlands, countries that used to be the Scotland's main trade partners before the union, and the English Navigation Acts severely limited Scottish ability to trade by sea, and made the Scottish ambitions to expand the trade beyond Europe unachievable. Opinion in Scotland at the time was that England was sabotaging Scottish economic expansion.

The frustration caused by economic and political rivalry with England led to the Darien scheme - an unsuccessful to establish a Scottish colony in the Gulf of Darién. Christopher Smout argues that the scheme was successfully sabotaged by England in various ways - it was seen as a threat to the privileged position of the East India Company, and as such England did everything to ensure the plan's failure via political and diplomatic overtures to prevent the Netherlands and Hamburg from investing into the scheme while also refusing to assist the settlers in any way. Following the disastrous failure of the scheme, Scottish economy seemed to be on the brink of collapse, but ultimately Scotland was able to recover from it fairly quickly.

By 1703, Scottish government was highly disillusioned and unsatisfied with the union, and many believed that the only way to let Scottish economy flourish was to separate from England. Fletcher of Saltoun called Scotland 'totally neglected, like a farm managed by servants not under the eye of the master', and the failure of the Darien Scheme was commonly attributed to English sabotage. Scottish parliament would try to establish its autonomy from England with 1704 Act of Security, which provoked a retaliation from England - Scottish ministers were bribed, and Alien Act 1705 was passed. According to the Alien Act, unless Scotland appointed commissioners to negotiate for union by Christmas, every Scot in England would be treated as an alien, leading to the confiscation of their English estates. Additionally, Scottish wares were to be banned from England. Christopher Smout notes that England desired to expand its influence by annexing Scotland:

The act sparked vehement anti-English sentiment in Scotland, and made the already hostile Scottish public even more opposed to England:

The Scottish economy was now facing a crisis, and the parliament was polarised into a pro-union and anti-union factions, with the former led by Daniel Defoe. The unionists stressed how important trade with England is to the Scottish economy, and portrayed trade with continental Europe as not beneficial, or nowhere as profitable as trading with England. They argued that the Scottish economy could survive by trading with England, and sanctions that would result from the Alien Act would collapse the economy. For Defoe, joining the union would not only prevent the Alien Act, but would also remove additional limitations and regulations, which could lead Scotland to prosperity. Anti-unionists questioned the English goodwill and criticised the unionist faction for submitting to the English blackmail. They argued that Scotland could make a recovery by trading with the Netherlands, Spain and Norway, with the diverse European markets allowing Scotland to diversify its own industries as well. They noted that the union would make Scotland unable to conduct independent trade policy, meaning that any possibility to remove the flaws in Scottish economy would be gone forever, which would turn Scotland into a "mere satellite of the richer kingdom". Ultimately, Scottish ministers voted in favour of the union, which was against the public opinion, as the Scottish population at the time was overwhelmingly against any union with England. Many considered themselves betrayed by their own elite, and Smout argues that the union bill was only able to pass thanks to the English bribery.

 300th anniversary 

A commemorative two-pound coin was issued to mark the tercentennial—300th anniversary—of the Union, which occurred two days before the Scottish Parliament general election on 3 May 2007.

The Scottish Government held a number of commemorative events through the year including an education project led by the Royal Commission on the Ancient and Historical Monuments of Scotland, an exhibition of Union-related objects and documents at the National Museums of Scotland and an exhibition of portraits of people associated with the Union at the National Galleries of Scotland.

 Scottish voting records 

 See also 
 Acts of Union 1800 (King of Great Britain with Kingdom of Ireland)
Kingdom of Ireland
 English independence
 List of treaties
 MacCormick v Lord Advocate Parliament of the United Kingdom
 Political union
 Real union
 Scottish independence
 Unionism in Scotland
 Welsh independence

Notes

References

Sources and further reading

 
 Campbell, R. H. "The Anglo-Scottish Union of 1707. II. The Economic Consequences". Economic History Review vol. 16, no. 3, 1964, pp. 468–477 online 
 
 
 
 
 
 
 
 
 
 
 
 
 
 
 
 
 
 Smout, T. C. "The Anglo-Scottish Union of 1707. I. The Economic Background". Economic History Review  vol. 16, no. 3, 1964, pp. 455–467. online 
 
 
 
 
 

 Other books 
 Defoe, Daniel. A tour thro' the Whole Island of Great Britain, 1724–27 Defoe, Daniel. The Letters of Daniel Defoe, GH Healey editor. Oxford: 1955.
 Fletcher, Andrew (Saltoun). An Account of a Conversation''
 Lockhart, George, "The Lockhart Papers", 1702–1728

External links 
 
 Union with England Act and Union with Scotland Act – Full original text
 Treaty of Union and the Darien Experiment, University of Guelph, McLaughlin Library, Library and Archives Canada
 
 
 Union with England Act 1707, from Records of the Parliaments of Scotland
 Image of original act from the Parliamentary Archives website

1706 in England
1706 in law
1707 in law
1707 in Great Britain
1707 in Scotland
Acts of the Parliament of England
Acts of the Parliament of England still in force
Acts of the Parliament of Scotland
Unionism in the United Kingdom
Constitutional laws of the United Kingdom
England–Scotland relations
Politics of the Kingdom of Great Britain
National unifications
Political charters
Unionism in Scotland
Treaties of England
Treaties of Scotland
1707 in British law
1706 in politics
Church of Scotland